Guarayu is a Tupian language of Bolivia that is spoken by the Guarayo people who number 23,910 in 2012.

The name Guarayu (Gwarayú) is a variant of Guarayo, which when used in a pejorative sense refers to several indigenous peoples in the area with the meaning of 'savage' or 'uncultured'.

The origin of the names is Guara meaning "warrior", and yu "pale" (yellow or white). Compared to other Guarani peoples, the Gwarayú are lighter in colour, and bear a striking resemblance to another Guarani group found in Paraguay the Ache.

Phonology 

 [ᵐp, ⁿt, ᵑk] are heard as allophones of /p, t, k/ when in nasal vowel position.

References

Further reading
Anónimo (2005). Gwarayu Ñe’ë, diccionario guarayo - castellano - guarayo. Cochabamba: Sociedad Bíblica Boliviana.
Hoeller, Alfredo (1932). Guarayo-Deutsches Wörterbuch. Guarayos: Verlag der Missionsprokura der P.P. Franziskaner, Hall in Tirol.

External links 
 Audio recordings of stories and conversation in Guarayu from the South American Languages Collection of Megan Crowhurst at AILLA.

Tupi–Guarani languages

Languages of Bolivia
Tupian languages
Mamoré–Guaporé linguistic area